The necktie paradox is a puzzle and paradox with a subjective interpretation of probability theory describing a paradoxical bet advantageous to both involved parties. The two-envelope paradox is a variation of the necktie paradox.

Statement of paradox

Two persons, each given a necktie, start arguing over who has the cheaper one. The person with the more expensive necktie must give it to the other person.

The first person reasons as follows: winning and losing are equally likely. If I lose, then I will lose the value of my necktie. But if I win, then I will win more than the value of my necktie. Therefore, the wager is to my advantage. The second person can consider the wager in exactly the same way; thus, paradoxically, it seems both persons have the advantage in the bet.

Resolution using fluid intelligence

The paradox can be resolved by giving more careful consideration to what is lost in one scenario ("the value of my necktie") and what is won in the other ("more than the value of my necktie"). If one assumes for simplicity that the only possible necktie prices are $20 and $40, and that a man has equal chances of having a $20 or $40 necktie, then four outcomes (all equally likely) are possible:

The first man has a 50% chance of a neutral outcome, a 25% chance of gaining a necktie worth $40, and a 25% chance of losing a necktie worth $40. Turning to the losing and winning scenarios: if the man loses $40, then it is true that he has lost the value of his necktie; and if he gains $40, then it is true that he has gained more than the value of his necktie. The win and the loss are equally likely, but what we call "the value of his necktie" in the losing scenario is the same amount as what we call "more than the value of his necktie" in the winning scenario. Accordingly, neither man has the advantage in the wager.

This paradox is a rephrasing of the simplest case of the two envelopes problem, and the explanation of the resolution is essentially the same.

See also 
 Bayesian probability
 Bertrand paradox
 Decision theory
 Monty Hall problem
 Two envelopes problem
 Newcomb's paradox
 St. Petersburg paradox

References

 

Probability theory paradoxes
Decision-making paradoxes